Real Life is the debut album by London band Real Lies, released on 16 October 2015 through independent label Marathon Artists.

Composition and production
The band developed the tracks on the album while living in Manor House, north London.

Reception

The album has received favourable reviews from publications including the Guardian and NME.

Track listing

References

2015 debut albums
Real Lies albums